Lonely Girl is an LP album by Julie London, released by Liberty Records under catalog number LRP-3012 as a monophonic recording in 1956, and later in rechanneled stereo under catalog number LST-7029 in 1959.

The album (minus "What'll I Do") was reissued, combined with London's 1957 album Make Love to Me, on compact disc on January 28, 2003, by EMI.

Track listing

Personnel
 Julie London – Vocals
 Al Viola – Guitar
 Bobby Troup – Producer
 John Neal – Engineer
 Ray Jones – Cover photography
 Chris Ingham – Liner Notes

For the reissue
 Andy Morten – Producer, design
 Joe Foster – Producer, recreation
 Norman Blake – Recreation
 Bob Norberg – Remastering

Charts

Notes

References
 

1956 albums
Julie London albums
Albums produced by Bobby Troup
Liberty Records albums
EMI Records albums